San Pedro de los Pinos is a station on Line 7 of the Mexico City Metro system. It is located in the Benito Juárez municipality of Mexico City, west of the city centre. In 2019, the station had an average ridership of 13,680 passengers per day.

Name and pictogram
The station is named for the neighborhood it serves: San Pedro de los Pinos. During 17th and 18th century, several ranches and haciendas were established in this area, as well as a bartizan, the bartizan of San Pedro, which was in the middle of the route going from the center of Mexico City towards Mixcoac or San Ángel in the south. The soil here was very fertile, thus, having plenty of groves, mainly pines. Hence the name San Pedro de los Pinos.

Therefore, the station's pictogram features a silhouette of two pine trees, as "pinos" means pines in Spanish.

General information
The station opened on 19 December 1985 as part of Line 7's third stretch, going from Tacubaya to Barranca del Muerto, the southern terminus of the line.

The station serves the San Pedro de los Pinos neighborhood.

Exits
East: Avenida Revolución and Calle 9, San Pedro de los Pinos
West: Avenida Revolución and Calle 4, San Pedro de los Pinos

Ridership

Gallery

References

External links
 

1985 establishments in Mexico
Mexico City Metro Line 7 stations
Railway stations opened in 1985
Mexico City Metro stations in Benito Juárez, Mexico City
Accessible Mexico City Metro stations